Allium pallasii  is a species of wild onion native to Central Asia, Mongolia, Altay Krai and Xinjiang. It occurs in deserts and dry steppes at elevations of 600–2300 m.

Allium pallasii had one round bulb up to 20 mm across. Scape is up to 30 cm tall. Leaves are tubular, shorter than the scape, up to 2.5 mm wide. Flowers are pale red or pale purple.

References

pallasii
Onions
Flora of temperate Asia
Plants described in 1775